
 

The Torsa Strict Nature Reserve
(officially Jigme Khesar Strict Nature Reserve)
in Bhutan covers 609.51 square kilometres in Haa District, occupying most of its area. Founded along with other national parks in 1993 by decision of the royal government, It borders Sikkim and Tibet to the west and is connected to Jigme Dorji National Park via a "biological corridor." Like Phibsoo Wildlife Sanctuary, Torsa SNR has no resident human population.

Flora and fauna 

This diverse ecosystem, home to various endangered species such as the Tibetan Snow Cock, Red Panda, Snow Leopard and Rufous Necked Hornbills, also grows in the reserve the only endemic poppy, the White Poppy.

Rivers 

The Amo Chu river that flows in from Tibet's Chumbi Valley is called Torsa Chu after it enters the Torsa SNR.

See also 
 List of protected areas of Bhutan

Notes

References

Eastern Himalayan broadleaf forests
Protected areas of Bhutan
Haa District
Important Bird Areas of Bhutan